NORAD is a board game originally published in 1973, and later published in 1977 by the Mishler Company.

Gameplay
NORAD is a game in which a massive Russian nuclear attack occurs against the United States which must defend itself.

Reception
Steve Jackson reviewed NORAD in The Space Gamer No. 32. Jackson commented that "Recommended (mostly for components) if you like the subject and want to develop your own variants. Otherwise, nothing more than an introductory game for the young or inexperienced."

References

Board games introduced in 1973